Velu (also Romanized as Velū and Velow) is a village in Ashrestaq Rural District, Yaneh Sar District, Behshahr County, Mazandaran Province, Iran. At the 2006 census, its population was 224, in 51 families.

References 

Populated places in Behshahr County